Conrad Karl Röderer (12 July 1868 in Trogen – 28 August 1928 in St. Gallen) was a Swiss sport shooter who competed in the late 19th century and early 20th century in pistol shooting. He participated in Shooting at the 1900 Summer Olympics in Paris and won two gold medals in 50 metre pistol and 50 metre team pistol for Switzerland.

References

External links
 

Swiss male sport shooters
ISSF pistol shooters
Olympic gold medalists for Switzerland
Olympic shooters of Switzerland
Shooters at the 1900 Summer Olympics
1868 births
1928 deaths
People from Appenzell Ausserrhoden
Olympic medalists in shooting
Medalists at the 1900 Summer Olympics